Highway 106 (AR 106, Ark. 106, and Hwy. 106) is an east–west state highway in Independence County. The highway of  runs from Highway 69 near Cushman south and east to Highway 69B (AR 69B) in Batesville.

Route description
Highway 106 begins at Highway 69 south of Cushman in western Independence County. The highway runs south past the Batesville Livestock and Forestry Research Station, a branch of the University of Arkansas System Division of Agriculture. Highway 106 continues south where Highway 106 Spur begins, running west to Bethesda. The parent route turns east at this point, passing a quarry and Ruddle Hill before entering the Batesville city limits and terminating at Highway 69B.

Major intersections

Bethesda spur

Highway 106 Spur (AR 106S, Ark. 106S, or Hwy. 106S) is a spur route to Bethesda.

Route description
The route begins at Highway 106 and runs west to Bethesda, a small unincorporated community.

Major intersections

See also

 List of state highways in Arkansas

References

External links

106
Transportation in Independence County, Arkansas